Brotherton is a village and civil parish in the Selby District of North Yorkshire, England. The village is on a border with the City of Wakefield and West Yorkshire (here formed by the River Aire).

History
Brotherton was historically part of the West Riding of Yorkshire until 1974. It is now on the A162, north of Ferrybridge, south of Fairburn. Brotherton is often mistaken as being in West Yorkshire; it is a North Yorkshire village.

According to the 2001 census Brotherton civil parish had a population of 672, rising to 728 at the 2011 Census.

Brotherton is the birthplace of Thomas of Brotherton, Earl of Norfolk, son of King Edward I and Margaret of France. Notable Brotherton residents include Ken Wharton (b 1950), a writer of Military History books, who lived in the village between 2005 and 2009.

Brotherton Church of England parish church, dedicated to Edward the Confessor, is in the Diocese of Wakefield.

Governance
Brotherton is part of Fairburn with Brotherton electoral ward. The total population of this ward as measured at the 2011 Census was 3,538.

References

External links

Villages in North Yorkshire
Civil parishes in North Yorkshire
Selby District
Knottingley